The Devil's in Love (also known as Consul of the Damned) is a 1933 American pre-Code drama film directed by William Dieterle and written by Howard Estabrook. The film stars Victor Jory, Loretta Young, Vivienne Osborne, David Manners, C. Henry Gordon and Herbert Mundin. The film was released on July 21, 1933, by Fox Film Corporation.

Cast        
Victor Jory as Dr. Andre Morand / Paul Vernay
Loretta Young as Margot Lesesne
Vivienne Osborne as Rena Corday
David Manners as Captain Jean Fabien
C. Henry Gordon as Captain Radak
Herbert Mundin as Bimpy
Émile Chautard as Father Carmion 
J. Carrol Naish as Salazar

Among the uncredited actors appearing are Bela Lugosi and Akim Tamiroff

References

External links
 

1933 films
Fox Film films
American drama films
1933 drama films
Films directed by William Dieterle
Films set in deserts
American black-and-white films
French Foreign Legion in popular culture
1930s English-language films
1930s American films